The 2021 season was Penangs 95th competitive season, 1st season in the first tier of Malaysian football  since promoted in 2020, 100th year in existence as a football club, and the 1st year since rebranded as Penang Football Club. The season covers the period from 1 December 2020 to 30 November 2021.

Coaching Staffs

Squad

 FP = Foreign player
 U22 = Under-22 player

Transfers and contracts

In

1st Transfer Window

2nd Transfer Window

Out

1st Transfer Window

2nd Transfer Window

Friendlies

Competitions

Malaysia Super League

League table

Result summary

Results by matchday

Matches

Malaysia Cup

Group stage

Statistics

Appearances and goals

Top scorers
The list is sorted by shirt number when total goals are equal.

Top assists
An assist is credited to a player for passing or crossing the ball to the scorer, a player whose shot rebounds (off a defender, goalkeeper or goalpost) to a teammate who scores, and a player who wins a penalty kick or a free kick for another player to convert.

The list is sorted by shirt number when total goals are equal.

Clean sheets
The list is sorted by shirt number when total clean sheets are equal.

Summary

References

2021
Penang F.C.
Penang